The Schlüechtli is a mountain of the Swiss Lepontine Alps, situated south of Versam in the canton of Graubünden. It lies between the valleys of Turischtobel and Safien, approximately 5 kilometres south of the anterior Rhine.

References

External links
 Schlüechtli on Hikr

Mountains of the Alps
Mountains of Graubünden
Lepontine Alps
Mountains of Switzerland
Two-thousanders of Switzerland